Stikine Sound is a body of water in the U.S. state of Alaska,  north of Wrangell. It was named by Mikhail Tebenkov. It forms where the Stikine River finally reaches salt walter. The delta of the river is the silted-up inland extension of this channel.

This arm of the sea is outlined by promontories of the mainland and by several islands. Several anchorages are found in this sound. At the northwest point of Zarembo Island is a number of islets, and on the east side of them there is anchorage in eighteen fathoms.

References

Bibliography

Sounds of Alaska
Bodies of water of Wrangell, Alaska